The 1992–93 season was the 94th season for FC Barcelona. In La Liga, there was an eerie sense of deja vu in the season as it came down to the final match day with Barcelona trailing Real Madrid by a solitary point. It seemed as though Real Madrid were poised to lift the title, playing their final game, ironically against Tenerife, who denied them the title on the final day of the previous season. Much to the shock of everyone, Tenerife beat Los Blancos 2–0, and with FC Barcelona beating Real Zaragoza 1–0, they won the third consecutive championship in a similar fashion to the previous season.

Surprisingly the side was defeated in early rounds of UEFA Champions League and lost the 1992 Intercontinental Cup against Brazilian team São Paulo.

Squad

Transfers

Winter

Friendlies

Competitions

Supercopa

La Liga

League table

Results by round

Matches

UEFA Champions League

First round

Second round

UEFA Supercup

Intercontinental Cup

Statistics

Players statistics

External links

FC Barcelona seasons
Barcelona
Spanish football championship-winning seasons